The Division of Reid is an Australian electoral division in the state of New South Wales.

History

The division is named after Sir George Reid, a former Premier of New South Wales and the fourth Prime Minister of Australia. The division was proclaimed at the redistribution of 13 September 1922, and was first contested at the 1922 federal election.

Under initial proposals for the 2009 redistribution, the Australian Electoral Commission proposed that the division be abolished. However, in the final proposal, the name "Reid" was retained for a division combining much of the now-abolished Division of Lowe with part of the old Division of Reid. Incidentally, the redistribution brought George Reid's old home, at Mount Royal, Strathfield, within the boundaries of the electorate that bears his name.

While the old Reid was historically a safe Labor seat, the 2009 redistribution made Reid far less safe for Labor, with its majority being slashed by six percent. That was partly because of the addition of territory from Lowe, which had been a marginal Labor seat for most of the time since the 1980s. John Murphy, the last member for Lowe, retained Reid for Labor at the 2010 election with just a two percent margin, after suffering an eight percent swing. At the 2013 election, the seat was won for the first time by the Liberal Party of Australia. The current Member for Reid, since the 2022 federal election, is Sally Sitou, a member of the Australian Labor Party.

Its most prominent member was Jack Lang, who served as Premier of New South Wales on two non-consecutive occasions – from 1925 to 1927, and then again from 1930 to 1932. Lang's second tenure as Premier ended in a constitutional crisis which resulted in Lang becoming the first head of government in Australia to be dismissed from office by a vice-regal representative – a case that has only happened once since, to the federal Whitlam Government in 1975. Lang carried on as New South Wales Opposition Leader until 1939, and remained in the New South Wales Legislative Assembly before transferring to federal politics in 1946. Lang's sole term as member for Reid was noted for his strong opposition towards the incumbent Chifley Government, though he did support efforts by the Government to nationalise private banks.

Other prominent members have included Tom Uren, who was a prominent Labor figure and minister who also served as Gough Whitlam's deputy from 1975 to 1977. Uren was succeeded upon retirement by Laurie Ferguson, the son of Jack Ferguson, who was a Deputy Premier of New South Wales, and the brother of Martin Ferguson, a former President of the Australian Council of Trade Unions and a minister in the Rudd and Gillard governments.

Boundaries
Since 1984, federal electoral division boundaries in Australia have been determined at redistributions by a redistribution committee appointed by the Australian Electoral Commission. Redistributions occur for the boundaries of divisions in a particular state, and they occur every seven years, or sooner if a state's representation entitlement changes or when divisions of a state are malapportioned.

The division is located in the inner-western suburbs of Sydney, and includes the suburbs of Abbotsford, Breakfast Point, Burwood, Cabarita, Canada Bay, Chiswick, Concord, Concord West, Five Dock, Flemington, Homebush, Homebush West, Liberty Grove, Mortlake, Newington, North Strathfield, Rhodes, Rodd Point, Russell Lea, Strathfield, Sydney Olympic Park, Wareemba, and Wentworth Point; and includes parts of Ashfield, Auburn, Croydon, Drummoyne, Lidcombe, Silverwater, and Spectacle Island.

Members

Election results

References

Electoral divisions of Australia
Constituencies established in 1922
1922 establishments in Australia